Yeniçağa District is a district of the Bolu Province of Turkey. Its seat is the town of Yeniçağa. Its area is 163 km2, and its population is 6,838 (2021). The district is on the inland side of Bolu Mountain and has a cold, hard, dry inland climate; the countryside is pine-forested on the northern and western parts of the district whereas the south-eastern parts are sparsely wooded hills.

Composition
There is one municipality in Yeniçağa District:
 Yeniçağa

There are 16 villages in Yeniçağa District:

 Adaköy
 Akıncılar
 Aşağıkuldan
 Çamlık
 Dereköy
 Doğancı
 Eskiçağa
 Gölbaşı
 Hamzabey
 Kemaller
 Kındıra
 Ören
 Şahnalar
 Sarayköy
 Yamanlar
 Yukarıkuldan

References

Districts of Bolu Province